"Last Nite" is a song by American rock band the Strokes. It was released on October 23, 2001, as the second single from their debut album, Is This It (2001). It was a moderate hit for the group on the UK Singles Chart in 2001.

Background
The track was produced by Gordon Raphael and was issued on RCA Records with the song "When It Started" as the B-side.

The song's opening guitar riff and overall structure is based on "American Girl" by Tom Petty and the Heartbreakers. In a 2006 interview with Rolling Stone, Petty commented, "The Strokes took 'American Girl' [for 'Last Nite'], there was an interview that took place with them where they actually admitted it. That made me laugh out loud. I was like, 'OK, good for you.' It doesn't bother me". The Strokes were invited to be the opening act for several dates on Tom Petty and the Heartbreakers' 2006 tour. The solo for the song was inspired by guitarist Freddie King.

Reception
The single was the group's first to enter the American charts, reaching the top five on the U.S. Modern Rock Tracks chart in late 2001. Meanwhile, the single obtained moderate success in the UK, peaking at number 14 on the UK Singles Chart.

In March 2005, Q placed "Last Nite" at number 66 in its list of the 100 Greatest Guitar Tracks. In September 2006, NME placed "Last Nite" at number one on its list of the 50 Greatest Tracks of the Decade. In May 2007, NME magazine placed "Last Nite" at number nine in its list of the 50 Greatest Indie Anthems Ever. It was also placed at number 16 on Rolling Stones 50 Best Songs of the Decade and number 478 on its list of "The 500 Greatest Songs of All Time". The same publication listed it at number 155 in a revamped version of the list in 2021. In 2011, NME placed it at number four on its list "150 Best Tracks of the Past 15 Years". In 2020, Paste and The Independent ranked the song number two and number one, respectively, on their lists of the 20 greatest Strokes songs.

Music video
The band were originally unwilling to appear in a music video, but eventually agreed to a simple format, performing the song live rather than lip-syncing to the recorded version, on a brightly lit stage. The resulting video, filmed with simple panning shots and few edits, was directed by Roman Coppola. One minute into the song, singer Julian Casablancas throws his microphone stand, as if it was a spear, off camera; the move would later be referenced in the music video for "Under Cover of Darkness", released 10 years later in 2011 on their album Angles.

As the song progresses, Casablancas' vocal becomes increasingly distorted as he sings ever closer into the microphone. On two occasions he dramatically throws the microphone to the ground. Following his solo, guitarist Albert Hammond, Jr., walking backwards into the drum podium, accidentally pushes one of drummer Fabrizio Moretti's overhead microphones which falls onto the drum kit. Moretti tries to hit it away with his drumstick, yet it topples onto the other overhead and both crash to the ground. The video, including the accident, is parodied in the music video for Sum 41's "Still Waiting".

Track listingsUS/UK"Last Nite" - 3:15
"When It Started" - 2:59AUS'''
"Last Nite"  - 3:15
"When It Started" - 2:59
"Last Nite" (Live) - 3:27
"Take It or Leave It" (Live) - 3:29

Personnel

 Julian Casablancas – vocals

 Nick Valensi – rhythm guitar

 Albert Hammond Jr. – rhythm guitar, lead guitar

 Nikolai Fraiture – bass
 Fabrizio Moretti – drums

Charts

Certifications

Release history

Vitamin C version

Background
American pop singer Vitamin C covered "Last Night" and released it as a single in July 2003. The song was produced by Dave Derby, Michael Kotch, and Fred Maher. The single features a sample from Blondie's "Heart of Glass". After Elektra Records dropped Vitamin C when her second album, More, did not sell as expected, she signed to V2 Records in the UK, hoping to break into the music scene there. After her third album was recorded, this single was released exclusively in the UK with plans to release the album a month later. The album was never released.

Reception
"Last Nite" debuted and peaking at number 70 on the UK Singles Chart and fell down the chart rapidly.Roberts, David (2006). British Hit Singles & Albums (19th ed.). London: Guinness World Records Limited. p. 588. . V2 shelved Vitamin C's album afterwards and dropped her. However, "Last Nite" is Vitamin C's only chart entry on the UK Singles Chart, making it her most successful single there.

Music video
The music video for "Last Nite" was shot in New York City. It features Vitamin C, as a blonde, in or around the Hotel Chelsea as well as other New York City night spots. The club CBGB is seen in the video.

Track listings
 "Last Nite" – 3:54
 "Last Nite" (Derby & Kotch Mix) – 3:45
 "Last Nite" (I Lick That Mix by Count Caligula) – 5:40
 "Last Nite" (Clique Remix) – 6:05

Charts

Cover versions, samples and parodies
 "Last Nite" was used in the parody "Angry White Boy Polka" by "Weird Al" Yankovic for his 2003 album Poodle Hat, sung in doo wop. 
 "Last Nite" was covered by Brazilian group Rebeldes' member Chay Suede for their two tours, Rebelde and Nada Pode Nos Parar, and was included in their live album, Rebeldes: Ao Vivo (2012).
 "Last Nite" was sampled in the song "Only Wanna Dance with You" by Kesha for her 2012 album, Warrior''.

References

2001 singles
2001 songs
2003 singles
2003 songs
Bertelsmann Music Group singles
Music videos directed by Roman Coppola
RCA Records singles
Songs written by Julian Casablancas
The Strokes songs
UK Independent Singles Chart number-one singles
V2 Records singles
Vitamin C (singer) songs